Dewaere is a surname. Notable people with the surname include: 

Lola Dewaere (born 1979), French actress, daughter of Patrick
Patrick Dewaere (1947–1982), French film actor
Prix Patrick Dewaere, film industry award